Erich Bürzle (born 9 February 1953 in Liechtenstein) is a Liechtensteiner former footballer and coach who managed the Liechtenstein national football team in 1990 and 1997.

References 

Liechtenstein international footballers
Liechtenstein football managers
Liechtenstein footballers
Living people
Association football midfielders
Liechtenstein national football team managers
1953 births